Angel Dust is the fourth studio album by American rock band Faith No More, released on June 8, 1992, by Slash and Reprise Records. It is the follow-up to 1989's highly successful The Real Thing, and was the band's final album to feature guitarist Jim Martin. It was also the first album where vocalist Mike Patton had any substantial influence on the band's music, having been hired after the other band members had written and recorded everything for The Real Thing except vocals and most of the lyrics. The band stated that they wanted to move away from the funk metal style of their prior releases, towards a more "theatrical" sound.

Angel Dust is Faith No More's best-selling album to date, having sold over 2.5 million copies worldwide. It also debuted at number 10 on the Billboard 200, making it the band's only top-ten album in the United States.

Background, title and artwork
Following the success of their previous album, The Real Thing and its subsequent tour, Faith No More took a break for a year and a half before beginning work on the follow-up, Angel Dust. During this time Mike Patton rejoined his high-school band Mr. Bungle to record their eponymous debut album. This situation had an effect on the band, since drummer Mike Bordin thought the writing process was like the state of a "magic slate" having been "completely covered in writing; there was not any more room for any more writing on that slate, so we all went and said all right, and erased everything, and started writing new stuff," and Patton was creatively revitalized. They decided not to "play it safe" and instead took a different musical direction, much to the dismay of guitarist Jim Martin. Martin also did not like the title of the album as chosen by keyboardist Roddy Bottum. In an interview taken while they were in the studio he said that "Roddy [Bottum] wanted to name it Angel Dust, I don't know why, I just want you to know that if it's named Angel Dust, it didn't have anything to do with me."

Bottum stated that he chose the name because it "summed up what [they] did perfectly" in that "it's a really beautiful name for a really hideous drug and that should make people think." Similarly, the artwork contrasted one beautiful image with a gruesome one by depicting a soft blue airbrushed great egret on the front cover (photographed by Werner Krutein) while on the back is an image of a cow hanging on a meat hook (created by Mark Burnstein). Both bassist Billy Gould and Mike Bordin said that the image on the rear of the album is not based on support for vegetarianism but rather a preview of the music, suggesting its combination of being "really aggressive and disturbing and then really soothing", the "beautiful with the sick".

The photo of a group of Russian soldiers with the band members' faces inserted was edited by Werner Krutein and used as the cover of the "Midlife Crisis" single. The band had originally planned for this but then did not like the final product. Mike Bordin described the situation:

The single cover is similar to that of Led Zeppelin II, which features the faces of the members of Led Zeppelin and others airbrushed into a 1917 photograph of Jagdstaffel 11, a German airplane squadron of the First World War led by Manfred von Richthofen (the "Red Baron").

Writing process
The writing for Angel Dust took up most of 1991 with large portion of the songs being written by either Billy Gould, Roddy Bottum, Mike Bordin, and for the first time, Mike Patton. Regarding this Patton said:

Some attributed this to its sonic difference with its predecessors, however, Mike Patton credits it to being "better at playing what [they] hear in [their] heads" and went on to say that "before, we used to kinda cheat around, and play around what it was. We could never translate it into the band, and we're getting better at doing that. Like, we wanted to do a real lazy, sappy kinda ballad, so we covered the theme from Midnight Cowboy! And there's even a song that sounds like The Carpenters!" In a trend that started when then-vocalist Chuck Mosley lived in Los Angeles while the rest of the band resided in the Bay Area, the band would record demo tapes of the songs and exchange them between each other in Los Angeles before sending them to Jim Martin so that he could work on his guitar arrangements, after which he would send them back for approval.

The lyrics for Angel Dust were written for the most part by vocalist Mike Patton. He got his inspiration for the lyrics from many different places such as questions from the Oxford Capacity Analysis, fortune cookies and late-night television. After engaging in a sleep deprivation experiment, he wrote "Land of Sunshine" and "Caffeine": "I drove around a lot in my Honda, drove to a real bad area of town, parked and just watched people. Coffee shops and white-trash diner-type places were great for inspiration."

Songs with lyricists other than Patton include "Be Aggressive" by Roddy Bottum (about fellatio); "Everything's Ruined", by Mike Patton and Billy Gould; "Kindergarten" by Mike Patton and Roddy Bottum; and "Jizzlobber", by Jim Martin and Mike Patton, which according to Patton, is about his fear of imprisonment. However, Gould, in response to a question by a fan, suggested that the song is about a porn star.

Recording process
For the recording of Angel Dust, Faith No More were once again assisted by Matt Wallace, who had produced all of the group's previous studio recordings. They entered Coast Recorders in late 1991 but January 1992, originally set to track a total of 17 songs; however after writing two more while in studio ("Malpractice" being one of them), a total of 19 were recorded. At that time, the final song titles had not been chosen so they were often referred to by the following working titles, some of which continued to be used internally by the band, including on their live set lists:
 "Triplet" – "Caffeine"
 "Madonna" – "Midlife Crisis"
 "Macaroni and Cheese", "Country Western Song" – "RV"
 "Arabic", "The Arabian Song" – "Smaller and Smaller"
 "F Sharp" – "Kindergarten"
 "I Swallow" – "Be Aggressive"
 "Japanese" – "A Small Victory"
 "Action Adventure" – "Crack Hitler"
 "The Sample Song" – "The World Is Yours"
 "The Carpenters Song" – "Everything's Ruined"
 "The Funk Song" – "Land of Sunshine"
 "The Shuffle Song"/"Seagull Song" – Unpublished recording.

While 13 tracks were released on the standard album, the sessions also produced a cover of the Commodores' "Easy", a reworking of the previously recorded "As the Worm Turns", and the posthumously released "The World Is Yours". While the songs "Das Schutzenfest" and the Dead Kennedys cover "Let's Lynch the Landlord" were both released along with "Easy" on an EP in late 1992, at least one of these songs was not actually recorded during the Angel Dust sessions: "Let's Lynch the Landlord" was recorded in Bill Gould's bedroom and produced by the band, prior to the Angel Dust sessions, for Virus 100, a Dead Kennedys tribute album. While it is unclear as to whether or not "Das Schutzenfest" is from the Angel Dust sessions, Matt Wallace is listed as the engineer for this song but is given no producer credit (in contrast with the co-producer credit he is given for Angel Dust).

Samples
There were many samples used on Angel Dust, to the point that it was called a "gratuitous" amount and record label executives were concerned about the volume of samples used. They came from such sources as Simon and Garfunkel, Diamanda Galás, Z'EV, and The Wizard of Oz. The Simon and Garfunkel sample is from the first bar of their song "Cecilia" and appears throughout the drum track of "Midlife Crisis". "Malpractice" contains a four-second sample of the second movement of Dmitri Shostakovich's String Quartet No. 8 as performed by the Kronos Quartet, on their album Black Angels; track 8, "Allegro molto", at 2:10. It features in four points towards the end of the song at 2:56, 3:02, 3:22 and 3:26. Many of the original samples used in the songs were recorded by Roddy on a Digital Audio Tape recorder whilst "just whilst wandering out and about". "Crack Hitler", as well as featuring samples of sirens in the background, features a sample in the intro of Iris Lettieri reading a flight announcement at the Rio de Janeiro-Galeão International Airport. She then tried to sue the band for using her voice without permission. There are also samples of aboriginal chanting, amongst the sound effects from Sound Ideas, in the background of "Smaller and Smaller". Also, a brief succession of sounds, including a police car siren and a warp noise, similar to what Frank Zappa abundantly made use of on his album Joe's Garage is recognizable in the song "A Small Victory". The song "Midlife Crisis" contains a sample of "Car Thief" by the Beastie Boys. The intro of "Caffeine" features sounds of animals, of which monkeys and a wolf can be distinguished. The B-side "The World Is Yours" by far featured the most samples of any songs, and was even referred to as "The Sample Song" by the band. The intro alone features a death sentence by rapid fire (the words "Aim. Fire!" can be heard), and an elephant. The bridge of the song includes a recording of Budd Dwyer's suicide that was broadcast on TV in 1987.

Touring and support
Faith No More started the tour to promote Angel Dust shortly after the album's completion on the European leg of the Use Your Illusion Tour with Guns N' Roses and Soundgarden, which Bottum described as a "complete European vacation" due to their light concert schedule. In an interview taken on June 6, 1992, Billy said:  
They continued on this tour through the North America leg with Guns N' Roses and Metallica before splitting off on their own European tour through Finland, Sweden, Denmark, Norway, seven performances from November 4–11 in Germany, the Czech Republic, Austria, 3 more performances in Germany, Belgium, Germany again, the Netherlands, Wales, England, where they played at the Cambridge Corn Exchange on November 23 then three nights straight at the Brixton Academy from November 25–27 and on the following night at the NEC Arena in Birmingham before going through Ireland, Scotland, where they played the first 4 nights of December in the Barrowland Ballroom before going back through England, Belgium, 3 performances from the December 8–10 in France, 3 performances from the December 12–14 in Spain, France again, Italy, Switzerland and Austria again before having a break for Christmas and New Year. They began touring America again in mid January 1993 in Seattle, Washington, and finishing in Utah a month later in mid February. Towards the end of April till mid May they toured through Australia and New Zealand before returning to Europe for a show in Germany on May 29 and the following day in Vienna then in Budapest. On June 2 they played at Rotterdam Ahoy followed by 4 performances in Germany from June 3–7 and one in Slovakia on June 10. Towards the end of June they performed on individual nights in Sweden, Denmark, Norway and Portugal then a few days later on July 3–4 in Torhout and Werchter, Belgium followed by one last show in Germany, on July 9, and a headline show at Ruisrock Festival in Turku, Finland July 10 before the final show of the tour in Stratford Upon Avon on July 17.

Despite reportedly being unhappy with the band's change in direction on Angel Dust, Jim Martin has since stated: "Live performances were always very strong. From my perspective, we came across a lot heavier than the records. Over time, the chord progressions and the arrangements would morph in subtle ways that would make the set heavier than the studio version."

Critical reception and legacy

Angel Dust was met with extensive critical acclaim. One critic wrote that the album is "one of the more complex and simply confounding records ever released by a major label" and similarly, another called it "the most uncommercial follow-up to a hit record ever". After hearing the album, the band's label warned them that releasing the album would be "commercial suicide". The single "A Small Victory" is described as a song "which seems to run Madame Butterfly through Metallica and Nile Rodgers, reveals a developing facility for combining unlikely elements into startlingly original concoctions".

The songs "Malpractice" and "Jizzlobber" have been called "art-damaged death metal" and "nerve-frazzling apocalyptic rock" by contrast with the "accordion-propelled" Midnight Cowboy theme cover that follows. AllMusic calls the album a "bizarro masterpiece", citing the vocals as "smarter and more accomplished" than its predecessor The Real Thing. It gave the album 4.5 stars out of 5, calling it one of their album picks. Kerrang! was less enthusiastic, considering Angel Dust'''s variety of styles "a personality disorder, of sorts, which undermines its potential greatness". In 1992, Spin commented that "there are slow, scary songs, and not as much funk-metal thrash as the average fan would expect."

The album was also called an "Album of the Year" in 1992 by seven different publications in four countries, making the top 10 in three of them and the top position in one, and was also named the "Most Influential Album of all Time" by Kerrang! despite an initially lukewarm review. Brad Filicky of CMJ New Music Report praised the album in 2003, reflecting, "Faith No More was often lumped in with the funk metal masses that were so popular in the early 90s, but after the success of The Real Thing, the group's first album with Mike Patton, FNM grew tired of the trappings and limitations of the genre. So, rather than release that era's equivalent of Significant Other, the band flipped the script entirely and dropped an experimental bombshell on the scene." In 2017, Rolling Stone ranked Angel Dust as 65th on their list of "The 100 Greatest Metal Albums of All Time". Oceansize frontman Mike Vennart named it one of the albums that changed his life. Mr. Bungle guitarist Trey Spruance labelled it as a "glorious record" in 2016. In March 2023, Rolling Stone ranked the album's second track, "Caffiene", at number 55 on their "100 Greatest Heavy Metal Songs of All Time" list.

Track listing

Bonus discs
There were several different bonus discs released with various editions and formats of the album.

Free Concert in the Park
This disc came with the third and fourth pressings of the Australian release, it contains four tracks labeled to be from a free concert at Munich, Germany on November 9, 1992. Although the date is correct, the venue is not, as it was recorded at Grugahalle Essen. .
"Easy" – 3:06
"Be Aggressive" – 4:12
"Kindergarten" – 4:15
"Mark Bowen" – 3:17

Woodpecker from Mars
This disc was a promotional release on Limited Edition pressings of Angel Dust in France. On the back it reads "ne peut être vendu séparément, offert avec l'album 'Angel Dust' dans la limite des stocks disponibles", which translates to "offered with the album Angel Dust while stocks last, not to be sold separately"
"Woodpecker from Mars" 
"Underwater Love" 

Midlife Crisis 12"
This disc was released with limited edition UK LPs as a double vinyl pack. The first disc (with or without the bonus disc) lacked the tracks "Crack Hitler" and "Midnight Cowboy"; the track "Smaller and Smaller" appeared as the last track (Cat no. 828 326–1).
"Midlife Crisis (The Scream Mix)" – 3:56
"Crack Hitler" – 4:39
"Midnight Cowboy" – 4:13

Interview disc
This disc was a promotional release on Limited Edition pressings of Angel Dust in Europe released on August 24, 1992 (Cat no. 828 321–2), and was also released separately in a slimline case (Cat no. FNMCD3). The questions were printed inside the packaging with answers on the CD listing 18:41.

Personnel
 Mike Bordin – drums
 Roddy Bottum – keyboards
 Billy Gould – bass
 Jim Martin – guitar
 Mike Patton – vocals

Production
 Matt Wallace – producer, engineer, mixing
 David Bryson – co-mixing
 Adam Munoz, Craig Doubet, Gibbs Chapman, Lindsay Valentine, Nikki Tafrallin – assistant engineering
 John Golden – mastering
 Kim Champagne – artwork direction
 Ross Halfin – band photo
 Wernher Krutein – bird photo, Red Square photo adaptation
 Mark Burnstein – meat photo

Accolades

Chart performance

Weekly charts

Year-end charts

Certifications

Release histories
In 2008 Mobile Fidelity Sound Lab remastered re-released Angel Dust'' on CD and LP.

Vinyl history

CD history

Cassette history

References

Notes 
 

Faith No More albums
1992 albums
Albums produced by Matt Wallace
Slash Records albums